No. 1 is the first studio album by the South Korean boy group Teen Top. The track 사랑하고 샆어 (I wanna love) was released on February 15, 2013 as a pre-released track. The full album was released both digitally and physically on February 25, 2013 using 긴 생머리 그녀 (Miss Right) as the promotional track.

A repackaged edition titled No.1 Repackage Special Edition was released to thank fans for their support.

Background
Teen Top's leader, C.A.P, contributed in writing lyrics for the song, Mr.Bang, along with Maboos and Chakun (from Electroboyz).

Track listing

No.1 [Repackage Special Edition]

Chart performance
The Limited Edition of No. 1 sold out within 2 days of its release through pre-orders online and offline.

Single chart

Album chart

References

2013 debut albums
Kakao M albums
Teen Top albums